Chandrapur Lok Sabha constituency is one of the 48 Lok Sabha (parliamentary) constituencies of Maharashtra state in western India. This constituency is spread over Chandrapur and Yavatmal districts.

Assembly segments
At present, Chandrapur Lok Sabha constituency comprises six Vidhan Sabha (legislative assembly) segments. These segments constituency number and reservation (if any) are:

Members of Parliament

^ by-poll

Election results

General elections 2019

General elections 2014

General elections 2009

See also
 Yavatmal district
 Chandrapur district
 List of Constituencies of the Lok Sabha

Notes

External links
Chandrapur lok sabha  constituency election 2019 results details

Lok Sabha constituencies in Maharashtra
Chandrapur district
Yavatmal district